Steven John Fletcher,  (born June 17, 1972) is a former Canadian politician. He served in senior roles in the Conservative Party of Canada in opposition and in government, including 5 years as a Federal Cabinet Minister. After four terms as a Member of Parliament, he served a term as a member of the Manitoba Legislative Assembly for one term.

Fletcher served in the House of Commons of Canada from 2004 to 2015, representing the riding of Charleswood—St. James—Assiniboia as a member of the Conservative Party. In 2004 the then leader of the opposition Stephen Harper appointed Fletcher to the shadow cabinet as health critic. After forming government, Fletcher was appointed as Parliamentary Secretary to Health in 2006. He was appointed to cabinet in 2008. He served on numerous cabinet committees. He was the Minister for Democratic Reform and then after the 2011 election, was appointed to Minister of State (Transport). He was the first quadriplegic and wheelchair user to serve in the House of Commons, as well as in Cabinet. Fletcher was appointed as Minister of State (Democratic Reform) on October 30, 2008. After the Conservative Party victory on May 2, 2011, Fletcher was appointed as Minister of State (Transport).

Fletcher received the Queen's Golden Jubilee Medal on December 17, 2002 for his contributions to society and advocacy work. He received the Queen's Diamond Jubilee Medal in 2012.

Fletcher was the leader of the Manitoba Party and an MLA in the Manitoba Legislative Assembly.

In an effort to increase the number of women in cabinet, Fletcher was left out of cabinet in the July 15, 2013 Cabinet shuffle by Prime Minister Stephen Harper. Although not officially in Cabinet, he continued to sit on the treasury board cabinet committee. Fletcher was defeated in the federal election of 2015, but was elected six months later to the riding of Assiniboia in Manitoba's 2016 provincial election.

Fletcher resigned his membership in the Federal Conservative party in October 2018, and his party membership in the Provincial Progressive Conservative Party in June of the same year, exactly one year after leaving the Provincial Caucus.

Early life and career

Fletcher was born in Rio de Janeiro, Brazil, where his Canadian father was working as an engineer.  He was raised in Manitoba, and attended Shaftesbury High School in Winnipeg.  Fletcher received a degree in Geological Engineering from the University of Manitoba in 1995.

He became a complete quadriplegic on January 11, 1996, after hitting a moose with his vehicle while travelling to a geological engineering job in northern Manitoba.  The accident left him completely paralysed below the neck, and he now requires 24-hour-a-day attendant care.  He was unable to speak for several months, and only regained this ability after a long process of recovery.

In the immediate aftermath of his accident, Fletcher was told that he would have to spend the rest of his life in an institution.  Years later, he joked: "I don't think the doctors ever thought the institution would be Parliament."  When asked about his disability during his first campaign for public office, he quipped: "I would rather be paralyzed from the neck down than from the neck up."

Before his accident, Fletcher was a wilderness canoe enthusiast.  He served as president of the Manitoba Recreational Canoeing Association, was a two-time former Manitoba Kayak Champion, and competed in national events.  He was able to resume his life as an outdoorsman in the mid-2000s through inventions such as the TrailRider, a device which allows quadriplegics to travel over rough terrain.  In late 2004, he was able to stand again with the assistance of an hydraulic wheelchair.  He recently competed in water races, and has won awards using "sip and puff" steering technology.  In 2006, he visited the Burgess Shale in the Rocky Mountains with the help of a TrailRider and other hikers.

Fletcher has said that the accident changed his political views.  He acknowledges that he "didn't give the less-fortunate any consideration" before 1996, but now describes himself as a "compassionate conservative".

Students' union president

Fletcher returned to the University of Manitoba in 1997 to take a Master of Business Administration (MBA) program.  He was elected president of the University of Manitoba Students' Union (UMSU) in February 1999, and identified his main priorities as improving the university's public profile and increasing access for students in financial need.  He also called for greater university access for disabled students and for higher aboriginal enrollment.  In October 1999, he met with federal Finance Minister Paul Martin to lobby for increased student funding.

Fletcher's political views often put him at odds with other campus organizations during much of his tenure, and he was sometimes accused of administrative bias against left-wing groups.  In early 2000, he supported a decision by student council to freeze university funding for The Manitoban, a campus newspaper with a left-leaning editorial board.  He argued that the issue at stake was one of financial accountability, although his opponents suggested he was trying to infringe on the paper's autonomy.  Funding was restored when the newspaper staff agreed to accept an Ombudsman Board.

Fletcher was elected as a director of the Canadian Alliance of Student Associations during his first term.  He was re-elected student body president in 2000, and presided over the elimination of the UMSU's debt in May 2000.  He credited a partnership with Starbucks for much of the council's $43,000 surplus.

In late 2000, Fletcher announced that he would seek the Progressive Conservative nomination for a provincial by-election in Tuxedo.  Some of his opponents later tried to remove him as student president, arguing that such partisan activity was inappropriate for someone elected to represent the interests of all students.  Fletcher argued that the university's constitution did not prevent him from participating in provincial politics, and described his opponents as "far left extremists".  He lost the provincial nomination to Heather Stefanson.  His opponents in the Graduate Students Association later voted to separate from the UMSU, although the University of Manitoba refused to sanction the separation.

Near the end of 2000, Fletcher endorsed a report from the right-wing Fraser Institute which suggested that Canada would have to end university union contracts and professorial tenure to retain bright young academics.  He was quoted as saying: "There is merit. You'd have to break the union, I would guess."

During the 2001 student election campaign, Fletcher, with the assistance of Colleen Bready, then UMSU vice-president, and a Security Services officer, performed an unannounced search of several student group offices. The affected groups included the Graduate Students' Association, the Womyn's Centre, Amnesty International, the U of M Recycling Group (UMREG), the Rainbow Pride Mosaic, and the Manitoban.  Fletcher and Bready said they had been "made aware of a suspicion" that campaign materials were being stored in the student group offices in violation of UMSU election bylaws. The search was condemned by other campus groups, with UMREG coordinator Rob Altemeyer describing Fletcher's actions as "completely inappropriate".  Fletcher defended his actions, saying: "It's UMSU space. We have the authority and the right to check [student organization] space at any time." Bready said they felt warranted since a slate of candidates had already been found guilty earlier in the week of using the Graduate Students' Association office for campaign activities.

In March 2001, Fletcher called for a central co-ordination body to oversee Manitoba's universities, arguing that the province "is too small to have five universities offering the same thing".  He opposed the provincial government's 2001 decision to build a new university in northern Manitoba.  Fletcher finished his second and final term as student president in May 2001, and received his MBA in 2002.

Political career

Party president

Fletcher was elected president of the Progressive Conservative Party of Manitoba in November 2001, and was re-elected in 2003.  His relationship with party leader Stuart Murray was sometimes fractious.  Fletcher criticized Murray in 2002 for hiring discredited advisor Taras Sokolyk without informing him, and suggested that Murray had not taken sufficient action to improve the state of the party's finances.

After Fletcher's election as party president, Manitoba Public Insurance announced that it would no longer provide travel expenses for his personal assistant.  A representative for MPI argued that attending party functions was not a prerequisite for Fletcher's stated career goal of becoming an elected politician, and indicated that the fund was not legally required to pay for these activities.  Fletcher appealed this decision before the Manitoba Court of Appeal, hiring former New Democratic Party cabinet minister Sidney Green as his attorney.  In May 2003, the Court of Appeal ruled that MPI has the discretion to fund such activities under Section 138 of the MPI Act, but is not obliged to use this discretion.  He later tried to appeal the decision to the Supreme Court of Canada, but the court twice declined to hear his case.  Fletcher filed a lawsuit against former provincial cabinet minister Becky Barrett in September 2003, arguing that she had "maliciously" interfered in his legal battles.

Federal politician

In late 2003, Fletcher defeated Don Murdock to win the Canadian Alliance nomination in Charleswood—St. James for the 2004 federal election.  He later supported the merger of the Canadian Alliance with the more centrist Progressive Conservative Party of Canada, and endorsed Stephen Harper's bid to lead the merged Conservative Party of Canada in early 2004.  Fletcher's Alliance nomination was rendered void by the merger, and he was required to contest another nomination for the new party.  He defeated Murdock a second time, and was declared the riding's Conservative Party candidate in March 2004.

Fletcher defeated star Liberal candidate Glen Murray, a popular former Mayor of Winnipeg, by 734 votes in the 2004 election.  His victory was considered an upset, although polls before election day indicated the result would be close.  The Liberal Party won a minority government nationally, and Fletcher was named as Senior Health Critic in the Official Opposition.

Fletcher is the first Member of Parliament (MP) in Canadian history with a permanent disability.  A running joke during his first campaign was that he would have to be a front bench MP, as the backbenches are not wheelchair-accessible.  His election created the need for a "stranger to the House"—a person who is not officially an MP or officer of Parliament—in this case, his aide, to actually be on the floor of the Commons during sessions.

The Parliament buildings had to be adapted to accommodate Fletcher. In Ottawa, Fletcher has advocated for community living, the integration of physically or mentally challenged individuals into society. He has said, “Community living is better for the individual for sure, better for their families, and in most cases—not all—it’s better on the taxpayer too.”

Opposition MP

As Conservative Health Critic, Fletcher described himself as a supporter of the Canada Health Act but also indicated a willingness to permit greater private-sector involvement.  He suggested that the government is "notorious for stifling innovation", and argued that the private sector should not be "pigeonholed like doctors who tried to pigeonhole me".  Liberal Health Minister Ujjal Dosanjh responded by arguing that the Conservative position would jeopardize the principles of the Canada Health Act.

On April 20, 2005, the House of Commons supported Fletcher's Motion to compensate all Canadians who were infected with Hepatitis C by the Canadian Red Cross as a result of its failure to test blood samples.  This was a major development in a decade-long struggle to have the pre-1986 and post-1990 Hepatitis C victims included in a federal compensation package.  A compensation funding package was announced in 2006.

The following month, Fletcher became involved in a controversy unrelated to his parliamentary duties.  On May 21, 2005, he apologized for saying "The Japs were bastards" at a veterans' convention in Winnipeg the previous week, in reference to Japanese Imperial Army during World War II.  He defended the general intent of his remarks, noting that his grandfather had witnessed the Japanese army commit atrocities when he was taken as a prisoner of war after that fall of Singapore.  He also acknowledged that he used "language that was inappropriate".

In November 2005, Fletcher and New Democratic Party MP Pat Martin endorsed a motion to minimize trans-fats in the Canadian food supply.  A task force to investigate the issue of trans-fats was subsequently struck, and provided recommendations to the government in 2007.

Government MP

Fletcher was re-elected with an increased majority in the 2006 federal election, as the Conservatives won a minority government nationally.  After the election, he was appointed as parliamentary secretary to the Minister of Health and the minister for the Federal Economic Development Initiative for Northern Ontario.

Fletcher supported Sam Katz's bid for re-election as Mayor of Winnipeg in 2006.  In late 2006, he assisted Liberal MP Andy Scott in presenting a motion for a national strategy on the treatment of persons with autism.  He received a 2006 Champion of Mental Health Award.

Fletcher has received awards for community involvement, including a special award from the National Cancer Leadership Forum for advocating a national cancer strategy. He has also received the Courage and Leadership Award from the Canadian Cancer Society, and was inducted into the Terry Fox Hall of Fame on November 13, 2006.  Fletcher was also awarded the King Clancy Award, as well as being a recipient of her Majesty's Golden Jubilee Medal for his contributions to Canada.

Fletcher has advocated for embryonic stem cell research using embryos that would otherwise be discarded from in-vitro fertilization techniques.  He stated on CBC's The National " I would ask this question. A Canadian who finds themselves with a terrible ailment or a loved one with a terrible ailment and there is a cure that is derived by embryonic stem cell research, would they deny their loved one or themselves that cure because of the source of the cure? Most Canadians would say please, cure me."

In March 2007, Fletcher began a campaign to have Ottawa's taxi service improve its wheelchair accessibility.  There is a book written by Linda McIntosh, a former Member of the Legislative Assembly in Manitoba, about Fletcher’s life entitled What Do You Do If You Don't Die? released in December 2008.

Minister of State (Democratic Reform)

After being elected for a third time in the 2008 federal election, Fletcher was appointed as Minister of State for Democratic Reform on October 30, 2008. Fletcher is the first person in history with a permanent disability to be named to the Canadian cabinet.  At the time of his appointment, he was quoted saying “I would pinch myself if I could.”

Fletcher is only the third federal conservative cabinet minister from a Winnipeg riding. The previous two were Gordon Churchill during the 1950s and the son of Canada's first Prime Minister, Hugh John Macdonald, who served as a cabinet minister in the late 19th century.

On March 4, 2010, Fletcher received the Christopher Reeve Award from the Canadian Paraplegic Association. Teren Clarke, Executive Director of the Canadian Paraplegic Association said when
the announcement was made. “Steven Fletcher’s journey is an inspiration to all of us since sustaining a high level spinal cord injury only a few years ago. And now as a member of the Federal Cabinet, he deals with matters well beyond the scope of disability issues, and that deserves our recognition with this national/international award.”

Minister of State (Transport)

Fletcher was re-elected in the 2011 General Election, after capturing 58 percent of votes. As Minister of State for Transport, Fletcher’s new responsibilities fall within the larger portfolio of the Honourable Denis Lebel, Minister of Transport, Infrastructure and Communities. In addition to continuing to serve on Treasury Board, Minister Fletcher also serves on the Cabinet Committee on Economic Prosperity and Sustainable Growth. “When it comes to Canada’s transportation systems, our Government is committed to protecting the safety and security of Canadians,” said Fletcher.

As Minister of State, Fletcher is responsible for the Crown Corporations the fall within the Transport portfolio. These include but are not limited to; Canada Post, VIA Rail, Canadian Air Transport Security Authority (CATSA), Ridley Coal Terminals, and half a dozen federally owned bridges. Fletcher also conducted National Round Tables on Infrastructure in the year 2012 to help develop a National Infrastructure Program. In budget 2013 a 70 Billion dollar investment over 10 years into infrastructure was announced by the Minister of Finance Jim Flaherty.

On January 16, 2012, Fletcher announced that he was temporarily stepping down from his position as Minister of State for Transport for an unspecified medical procedure.

Fletcher underwent a 12-hour surgery on January 19, 2012. The doctors removed an old titanium rod and replaced it with a much longer rod, this time secured to the back of his neck, not the front. It stretches from the middle of Fletcher's head to the middle of his back. "If our civilization lasts 1,000 years, my neck will last 1,000 years. It feels better than I can remember," Fletcher said.

On March 26, 2012, Fletcher returned to office and resumed full activities as Minister of State (Transport) and Member of Parliament for Charleswood – St. James – Assiniboia – Headingley.

On July 15, 2013, Fletcher was moved from Cabinet by Prime Minister Stephen Harper in order to make way for more women in a wide-ranging cabinet shuffle that saw several members of the Cabinet replaced.  Fletcher stated on Twitter "I am Conservative. I am a traditionalist. I wish I had left Cabinet in the traditional way--- with a sex scandal." Prime Minister Harper kept Fletcher on Treasury Board after the Cabinet Shuffle. Fletcher was the longest serving member on the board.

In March 2014, Fletcher introduced a private member's bill to make physician-assisted death legal under Canadian laws. When the Supreme Court struck down the law prohibiting assisted suicide in February 2015, Fletcher spoke out in support of the court's ruling. The Supreme Court used a substantial portion of Fletchers private members bill word for word in their decision

During the 2015 election a book titled "Master of My Own Fate" was released, written by Linda McIntosh and Steven Fletcher. The book chronicles the seven years after the end of the first biography "What Do You Do If You Don't Die?" by Linda McIntosh. The book describes events leading up to Fletcher introducing his two private member bills on physician assisted death. It also provides anecdotes on people and events on Parliament Hill including the October 2014 shooting at Parliament Hill and well known Conservatives who are now deceased including former finance minister Jim Flaherty and former senator Doug Finley.  The views of other former and current parliamentarians on this issue include Senator Nancy Ruth, Senator Larry Campbell, MP Peter Kent, former MP Svend Robinson and Green Party leader Elizabeth May.

Fletcher was defeated in the 2015 federal election by Liberal Doug Eyolfson as the Conservatives lost all of their seats in Winnipeg.

Provincial MLA
Six months after his defeat, Fletcher moved to provincial politics when he was elected for as the Progressive Conservative MLA for Assiniboia, which covers much of his former federal riding.

Fletcher was later removed from the PC caucus after publicly breaking with the party on multiple issues, specifically the creation of a new Crown Corporation and the Manitoba government’s attempt to introduce a Manitoba only carbon tax. On September 11, 2018, Fletcher became leader of the Manitoba Party.

According to the Winnipeg free press, three reasons lead to Fletchers removal from the PC Manitoba caucus. They are; His introduction of private members legislations, opposing a government bill to create a crown corporation for energy efficiency, and a presentation he gave at a town hall hosted by Manitoba Forward.[75] [76] [77]

Fletcher argued that the PC party did not run on creating a new Crown corporation. That the new crown corporation went far beyond what the government had stated and included items such as potable water. His main argument is that Manitoba has a massive supply of hydro generated power and continues to build more generation at the cost of billions of dollars, with no acceptor to sell the power. Fletcher argues that the demand side management of power usage is not appropriate in the Manitoba context. This is because supply of power will exceed the demand for power until 2044. Combine with the facts that 97% of Manitoba power generation is clean, cheap, green energy, it does not help the environment or hydro fiscal position to reduce the demand of a product that Manitoba has far too much of. In addition, due to the over building undertaken by Manitoba Hydro under the previous government, Hydro has no choice but to raise rates. This in itself with reduce demand. The additional cost of creating a crown will increase rates further due to the huge expense.

Fletcher has introduced many pieces of legislation as an Independent member, or as leader of the new Manitoba party.

List of Legislation introduced by Fletcher as an MLA

Indigenous Representation Act . This landmark legislation provides a template on how to increase Indigenous representation in the Manitoba Legislature. The legislation is designed to be constitutional within the gift of the Manitoba legislative assembly, and is inspired by current practices in New Zealand.

The Gift of Life Act . This legislations is designed to increase organ donations, it changes the paradigm to assume that everyone is a organ donor for transplant purposes, unless they state otherwise. [http://web2.gov.mb.ca/bills/41-2/pdf/b213.pdf

The Conflict of Interest Amendment Act. This legislations purpose is to update the current legislation which Fletcher describes as "woefully inadequate". [6] [78]

The Electoral Divisions Amendment Act. This legislation would reduce the number of seats in the Manitoba legislature by 8. The current number of sitting MLA's are 57, Fletchers bill would reduce is to 49 by the next election. Fletcher argues that we are over governed in Manitoba, there would be significant cost savings and increase the competition to be an MLA. [79]

The Manitoba Public Insurance Act. This bill would remove artificial caps that penalize youth, and the catastrophically injured given Manitoba's no fault system for automobile collisions. [7]

Brookside Cemetery Recognition Act. This legislation will recognize one of the largest Commonwealth cemetery's in the world, and Winnipeg's oldest cemetery's. Many historic figures have been laid to rest here.

The Legal Profession Amendment Act (Queen's Counsel Appointments). This legislation recognizes lawyers who have served society with distinction, it will bring Manitoba inline with other provinces. [80]

Fletcher also announced that he would be launching a constitutional court challenge against the legislation introduced by the previous government affecting parliamentary privilege.

Fletcher has also challenged the Manitoba legislature to become more accessible to Manitobans, in particular the legislative buildings needed to be updated to meet modern wheelchair accessible laws.

Return to federal politics
On May 22, 2019, Fletcher announced he would run again for his former seat in Charleswood—St. James—Assiniboia—Headingley for the party of another former Conservative minister Maxime Bernier with the People's Party of Canada. Fletcher claimed that he and Bernier are "ideological soulmates."

Electoral record

Provincial elections

Federal elections

All electoral information is taken from Elections Canada.  Italicized expenditures refer to submitted totals, and are presented when the final reviewed totals are not available.

Footnotes

External links
Steven Fletcher official site

The Steven Fletcher Story

1972 births
Autism activists
Canadian politicians with disabilities
Conservative Party of Canada MPs
Living people
Members of the 28th Canadian Ministry
Members of the House of Commons of Canada from Manitoba
Members of the King's Privy Council for Canada
Members of the United Church of Canada
People with tetraplegia
Politicians from Winnipeg
Independent MLAs in Manitoba
Progressive Conservative Party of Manitoba MLAs
University of Manitoba alumni
Canadian health activists
Canadian Disability Hall of Fame
People's Party of Canada